Anthony Barboza (born 1944 in New Bedford, Massachusetts) is a photographer, historian, artist and writer.  With roots originating from Cape Verde, and work that began in commercial art more than forty years ago, Barboza's artistic talents and successful career helped him to cross over and pursue his passions in the fine arts where he continues to contribute to the American art scene.

Barboza has a prolific and wide range of both traditional and innovative works inspired by African-American thought, which have been exhibited in public and private galleries, and prestigious museums and educational institutions worldwide.  He is well known for his photographic work of jazz musicians from the 1970s – '80s.  Many of these works are in his book Black Borders, published in 1980 with a grant from the National Endowment for the Arts.  In an article printed in 1984 in The City Sun, he said, "When I do a portrait, I'm doing a photograph of how that person feels to me; how I feel about the person, not how they look.  I find that in order for the portraits to work, they have to make a mental connection as well as an emotional one.  When they do that, I know I have it."  Many of his photographs achieve his signature effect through the careful use of lighting and shadows, manipulation of the backdrop, measured adjustments to shutter speeds, composition, and many other techniques and mediums at his command.

His most recent conceptual photographic artwork exhibit, Black Dreams/White Sheets, has toured internationally and was shown for the first time in New York City at the Bill Hodges Gallery in November and December 2010.  Barboza takes a critical look at the role and experiences of the African diaspora in the historical as well as contemporary context of race, sexuality, gender, politics, and social issues in American society and culture.

Career
Barboza came to New York City directly after graduating high school in 1963 at the age of 19 to study photography with Hugh Bell, a successful Black fashion photographer who became his mentor and allowed Barboza to work for free in exchange for the opportunity to gain experience in the field.  Prior to that, he met Adger Cowans, another of the few successful Black commercial photographers of the time, who would introduce Barboza to a group of Black professional photographers who were members of The Kamoinge Workshop.  This group was originally directed by Roy De Carava and was created to promote serious dialogues about photography at a time when African-American photographers were still being discriminated against and excluded from mainstream professional photography.  They were professionals who joined forces to support and help promote each other's work by offering group commentary and criticism, and by mounting exhibitions together.  Barboza carries on this tradition as the current president of what is now known as Kamoinge, Inc. and continues to support other Black professional and aspiring photographers in their work.

In 1965, Barboza was drafted into the Navy and became a full-time photographer for the Jacksonville, Florida-based newspaper The Gosport.  It was there that he developed his craft and launched his career in a one-man exhibition at the Pensacola Art Museum and the Emily Lowe Gallery at the University of Miami.

Photojournalism/editorial spreads
Barboza's work has appeared in photojournalist and editorial spreads for:  The New Yorker, Newsweek, Business Week, TV Guide, National Geographic, Town and Country, Village Voice, Vibe, US, Vanity Fair, People, Esquire, GQ, Home, Elle (US, Canadian, French, and Spanish editions), Elle Decour, Vogue, McCalls, Interview, Details, Black Book, Harper's Bazaar, Self, Glamour, Ms., Woman's Day, Cosmopolitan, Playboy, Ebony, Black Enterprise, Geo (Germany), Art News, Washingtonian, Modern Maturity, Mode, Audubon, Redbook, Telegraph Magazine (U.K.), The Sunday Times Magazine (U.K.) Forbes, Fortune, USA Weekend, Dance Magazine, Life Magazine, and The New York Times Sunday Magazine.

Advertising
Other work Barboza has done has been for Coca-Cola, Pepsi, General Motors, Kraft Foods, HBO, Kodak, Revlon, AT&T, the U.S. Army, the U.S. Marines, Sony, Miramax Films, Burger King, Aetna Life Insurance, Arista Records, Nissan, Coors, Absolut Vodka, Reebok, Random House, Hanes, Clairol, Amtrak, Bahamas Tourist Board, Avon, Columbia Records, L'Oreal, and many more.

Television
Barboza was a co-director for a TV commercial featuring his friend and jazz legend Miles Davis for Dentsu Advertising of Japan.

Art
 2011  Hip-Hop: A Cultural Odyssey – Aria Multimedia Entertainment Publ. – Los Angeles, CA
 2010  Ain't Nothing Like the Real Thing: How the Apollo Theater Shaped American Entertainment-2010-Smithsonian Books
 2010  Cousin Corrinne's Reminder issue #2- 2010 – Publ. Cousin Corrine Books-Brooklyn, NY
 2010  Whitewall magazine -Winter- -publ. – Sky Art Media – NYC
 2010  Harlem – Rizzoli Studio Museum
 2009  Posing Beauty – Norton publ.
 2009  Picturing New York – Museum of Modern Art, publ.
 2009  100 New York Photographers – Schiffer publ.
 2002  Day in the Life of Africa – Harper Collins publ.
 2001  Committed to the Image:  Contemporary Black Photographers – Brooklyn Museum of Art in association with Merrell
 2000  Jazz:  A History of America's Music by Geoffrey C. Ward and Ken Burns – Alfred A. Knopf publ., NYC
 2000  Black Beauty by Ben Arongundade (Cover) – Pavilion Books, London, UK
 1999  The Essence Total Makeover:  Body, Beauty, Spirit – Crown Publ., NY
 1999  Khaki “Cut from the Original Cloth” – Tondo Books
 1998  Men of Color:  Fashion, History and Fundamentals by Lloyd Boston Jr. Workman Publ.
 1998  Collecting African American Art: Works on Paper and Canvas by Halima Taha- Crown Publ., NY
 1998  Commitment:  Fatherhood in Black America – Museum of Art and Archeology, University of Missouri-Columbia
 1997  Dark Eros/Black Erotic Writings (Poetry & Nude photos) – St. Martin Press
 1997  Black Art and Culture in the 20th Century – Thames and Hudson, London, UK
 1996  Jerusalem – In the Shadow of Heaven – Collins Publ.
 1995  Essence: 25 Years Celebrating Black Women – Abrams, NY
 1994  Day in the Life of Israel – Viking
 1994  Artist and Influence Vol XIII (Cover) – Hatch-Billops Collection
 1993  African Americans – Viking
 1992  Songs of My People – Little Brown
 1992  Shooting Stars – Stuart, Tabori & Chang
 1992  Flesh & Blood – Picture Project
 1992  Color of Fashion – Stuart, Tabori & Chang/Kodak
 1992  Day in the Life of Hollywood – Collins Publ.
 1992  Outtakes (Portfolio) – I.C.P.
 1990  The Meaning of Life – Time/Life
 1989  Black Photographers 1940–1988 (Portfolio) – Garland publ.
 1988  International Photo Magazine Ten.  8  (Cover, Portfolio) London
 1986  Cliches Magazine 26 International Edition (Portfolio)
 1985  American Photography, Vol. 1
 1984  A World History of Photography, by Naomi Rosenbloom
 1983  Macmillan's Biographical Encyclopedia of Photographic Artists and Innovators – Macmillan Publ., NY
 1982  Verlag Photographers – Polaroid Corp.
 1981  Camera Arts Magazine (Portfolio)
 1981  SX-70 Lustrum Press
 1981  Fashion Theory – Lustrum Press

Permanent collections
 Cornell University, Ithaca, NY
 Museum of Modern Art, NYC, NY
 Studio Museum of Harlem, NYC, NY
 Howard University, Washington, DC
 University of Ghana, Ghana
 New Jersey State Museum, Trenton, NJ
 Polaroid Collection, Polaroid Corp., Cambridge, MA
 Brooklyn Museum, Brooklyn, NY
 The Museum of Fine Arts, Houston, Houston, TX
 Orleans Public Library, Orleans, NY
 University of Mexico, Mexico City, Mexico
 Chiang Kai-shek Memorial Hall, Taipei, Taiwan
 Schomburg Center, New York Public Library, NYC, NY
 National Portrait Gallery, Smithsonian Institution, Washington, DC
 Mott-Warsh Collection, Detroit, MI
 The Baltimore Museum of Art, Baltimore, MD

Exhibitions
 2010  Black Dreams/White Sheets, Bill Hodges Gallery, NYC, NY
 2010  We Want Miles – Montreal Museum of Fine Arts, Montreal, Canada
 2010  Posing Beauty – Hamilton Art Gallery, Hamilton, Quebec, Canada
 2009  We Want Miles – Citi de la Musique, Paris, France
 2009 Champs Elysees Photo Festival (Paris, France)
 2009 African American Museum of Nassau County, NY
 2006 Sheldon Art Gallery, St. Louis, Mo. (One-man Show, Jazz Moves)
 2006 Nordstrom Dept. Stores, 14 Stores (Group Show – Kamoinge)
 2003–2006 MTA New York City Transit Light Box Project 42nd & 6th Avenue Station (Jazz Moves – Solo)
 2001, May – 2002, Feb Missouri History Museum, St. Louis, MO (Group exhibit Miles Davis Retrospective)
 2001 Brooklyn Museum, NY (Group show, Committed to the Image: Contemporary Black Photographers)
 1999  Smithsonian Institution, Washington, DC (Group exhibit, Seeing Jazz)
 1999 UFA Gallery, NYC (Group Show, Jazz Plus)
 1997 Chiang Kai-shek Memorial Hall, Taipei, Taiwan (Group Show, International Exhibition of Photography & Related Visual Arts)
 1996 Robert Mann Gallery, NYC (One-Man Show, Piano for Days)
 1996 Gallerie im Haus 19, Munchen, West Germany (Group show, FE:MALE, The Beauty of Human Form)
 1990  Time-Life Tour (Group show Songs of My People)
 1990  Cinque Gallery, NY (Two-Man show, Jazz)
 1989  Drew University (One-Man show)
 1989 Washington, DC, Project of the Arts (Group show, The Blues Aesthetic Black Culture and Modernism)
 1985 City of Munich, West Germany (Group show, Nude in Photography). Exhibition and Book
 1984 photokina, West Germany (Group show)
 1982 Studio Museum of Harlem, NYC (One-man show, Introspect)
 1982 photokina West Germany (Group show)
 1978 Museum of Modern Art, NYC (Group show, Mirrors and Windows: American since 1960)
 1975  International Center of Photography, NYC (Group show Kamoinge Workshop)
 1974 James Vanderzee Institute, Friends Gallery of New York (One-man show)
 1974 Light Gallery, NYC (One-man show)
 1974 Columbia College of Chicago (Group show)
 1973 Light Impressions Gallery, Rochester, NY (One-man show)
 1972 Floating Foundation of New York City (Group show)
 1972 Studio Museum of Harlem, NYC (Group show: Eye rap)
 1971  Studio Museum of Harlem, NYC (Group show: The Kamoinge Workshop)
 1971  Addison Gallery of American Arts, Andover, Mass. (One-man show)
 1971 Studio Museum of Harlem, NYC (One a Piece)
 1969 Swain School of Design, New Bedford, Mass. (One-man show)
 1969 Jacksonville Art Museum, Jacksonville, Florida (One-man show)
 1968 Morgan State College, Baltimore, MD (One-man show)
 1967 Emily Lowe Gallery, University of Miami, FL (One-man show)
 1966 Pensacola Art Museum, Pensacola, FL (One-man show)

Publications

Film documentary
 Ken Burn's Jazz, PBS Broadcast, 2001

Oral history
 Oral History Interview With Anthony Barboza, Smithsonian Archives of American Art, 2009

Books

 Eye Dreaming: Photographs by Anthony Barboza. By Anthony Barboza, Aaron Bryant, and Mazie M. Harris, with an introduction by Hilton Als. Published by J. Paul Getty Museum, October 2022.
 Black Borders.  Photographs by Anthony Barboza, text by Ntozake Shange and Steven Barboza.  Self-published 1980, with a grant from the National Endowment for the Arts

Lectures
 2011 Black Portrait Symposium, Tisch School of the Arts, New York University, NY
 2009 Nassau Community College, Long Island, NY
 2007 Columbia College of Photography, Chicago, IL
 2005 Tisch School of the Arts, New York University, NY
 2002 Wadsworth Anthenum, Hartford, CT
 2001 Rhode Island School of Design, Providence, RI
 1993 Guest teacher (one semester,) Tisch School of the Arts, New York University, NYC, NY
 1991 Rochester Institute of Technology, Rochester, NY
 1989 Lowell University, Lowell, MA
 1985 Ohio University, Athens, OH
 1986 Oberlin College, Oberlin, OH
 1983 International Center of Photography, NYC, NY
 1983 Columbia College of Photography, Chicago, IL
 1982 Massachusetts State Council of the Arts
 1975 International Center of Photography, NYC, NY

Columns
 2009–present Monthly column, "BL!NK",  www.Southcoasttoday.com

Grants
 2000 New York Foundation of the Arts
 1980 National Endowment of the Arts
 1976 & 1974 New York State Council of the Arts

Service
 1998–2000 Associate Curator of Photography for the 2001 exhibition Committed to the Image:  Contemporary Black Photographers, Brooklyn Museum, Brooklyn, NY
 1981 Panelist-judge, National Endowment of the Arts
 1978 Panelist-judge, Massachusetts State Council of the Arts
 1973 Panelist-judge, New York State Council of the Arts

Personal life
Anthony Barboza is married to Laura Carrington, a starring actress in the 1984 Lionel Richie video number one hit, "Hello".  She is also a groundbreaking daytime soap opera actress who played the role of Simone Ravelle Hardy on the soap opera "General Hospital" from 1987 to 1989.  They have been married for more than 25 years and live in Westbury, New York with their three children Danica Barboza, Alexio Barboza and Lien Barboza.

He also has two children, Laryssa Gobets and Leticia Barboza from a previous marriage to Maria Correa.

References
 Bey, Dawoud, "A Light from a Darkroom." The City Sun, Arts Section, August 1, 1984: 15, 18. Print.
 Shumard, Ann, "Oral History Interview With Anthony Barboza," Smithsonian Archives of American Art, November 18–19, 2009.
 Oral history interview with Anthony Barboza, 2009 November 18–19
 Ryan, Ken, "East Meadow Resident Displays Famous Jazz Photos," eastmeadowpatch.com. Retrieved February 12, 2011
 East Meadow Resident Displays Famous Jazz Photos
 Jacobson, Aileen, "A Photographer Shares the Work That Fed His Soul", The New York Times, February 15, 2009: 8.  Print.
 100 New York Photographers, Cynthia Maris Dantzi and Black Photographers, Artistic Signatures, ink.
 “Anthony Barboza in Conversation with Bill Gaskins.” Nka: Journal of Contemporary African Art, vol. 2015, no. 37, Nov. 2015, pp. 16–27. EBSCOhost, https://doi.org/10.1215/10757163-3339827.

Notes

Sources and further reading
 Wilmer, Val, Barboza: The Music of Ourselves, Ten.8, No.24, 1986

External links 
 Black Dreams/White Sheets by anthony barboza
 "Anthony Barboza – Home Portfolio", Voz′.
 Collection Highlights — "Anthony Barboza: James Baldwin"
 Undergraduate Film & Television
 Commitment Fatherhood in Black America Carole Patterson Anthony Barboza, Arvarh E. Strickland, Minion KC Morrison, Clyde Ruffin, Marlene Perchinske Museum of Art and Archaeology
 WE WANT MILES
 "Souls of Black Genius: Images of Sound and Vision — An exhibit of photographs by Anthony Barboza", February 3 – March 3, 2010, Kinetic Gallery
 CATE | POSING BEAUTY
 "Oral history interview with Anthony Barboza, 2009 Nov. 18–19" from the Smithsonian Archives of American Art
 Photograph of James Baldwin, 1975, in the collection of The Baltimore Museum of Art
 New book: "Timeless: Photographs by Kamoinge" is edited by Anthony Barboza, President of Kamoinge, Inc, and Herb Robinson, Coedited by Vincent Alabiso, Foreword by Quincy Troupe

1944 births
African-American photographers
Living people
American people of Cape Verdean descent
Photographers from New York (state)
Photographers from Massachusetts
People from New Bedford, Massachusetts
People from Westbury, New York
20th-century American photographers
20th-century American male artists
21st-century American photographers
21st-century American male artists
20th-century African-American artists
21st-century African-American artists
Jazz photographers